HMS Caroline is a decommissioned  light cruiser of the Royal Navy that saw combat service in the First World War and served as an administrative centre in the Second World War.  Caroline was launched and commissioned in 1914. At the time of her decommissioning in 2011 she was the second-oldest ship in Royal Navy service, after .  She served as a static headquarters and training ship for the Royal Naval Reserve, based in Alexandra Dock, Belfast, Northern Ireland, for the later stages of her career. She was converted into a museum ship.  From October 2016 she underwent inspection and repairs to her hull at Harland and Wolff and opened to the public on 1 July 2017 at Alexandra Dock in the Titanic Quarter in Belfast.

Caroline was the last remaining British First World War light cruiser in service, and she is the last survivor of the Battle of Jutland still afloat.

Construction

HMS Caroline was built by Cammell Laird of Birkenhead.  She was laid down on 28 January 1914, launched on 29 September 1914 and completed in December 1914. Caroline was part of the early sub-set of C-class light cruisers built without geared turbines and subsequent comparisons with later vessels of the same class demonstrated the superiority of geared propulsion.  Carolines machinery is still in place today, although not in working order.

Operational history

First World War
Caroline was commissioned on 4 December 1914 and served in the North Sea throughout the First World War. Upon commissioning, she joined the Grand Fleet based at Scapa Flow in the Orkney Islands, serving as leader of the 4th Destroyer Flotilla. She was part of the Grand Fleets 1st Light Cruiser Squadron from February to November 1915. In early 1916 she joined the Grand Fleet's 4th Light Cruiser Squadron and remained with it, fighting as part of it at the Battle of Jutland on 31 May – 1 June 1916 under the command of Captain Henry R. Crooke, through to the end of the war in November 1918. From 1917 until late 1918, she carried a flying-off platform for the launching of Royal Naval Air Service and later Royal Air Force fighters to intercept German airships operating over the North Sea.

Interwar years
Caroline remained in the 4th Light Cruiser Squadron after World War I and in June 1919 went with the rest of the squadron to serve on the East Indies Station. In February 1922 she paid off into dockyard control and was placed in reserve. She came out of reserve in February 1924 to become a headquarters and training ship for the Royal Naval Volunteer Reserve's Ulster Division at Belfast, Northern Ireland, officially beginning those duties on 1 April 1924. Harland and Wolff of Belfast removed her weaponry and some of her boilers around 1924, after her arrival in Belfast. Her guns were pooled with those of other decommissioned cruisers and used to reinforce the coastal defences of the Treaty Ports.

Second World War

From 1939 until 1945, during the Second World War, Caroline served as the Royal Navy's headquarters in Belfast Harbour, which was used as a home base by many of the warships escorting Atlantic and Arctic convoys, including s of the 3rd Escort Group.

As Belfast developed into a major naval base during the Second World War, its headquarters outgrew the confines of HMS Caroline herself and occupied different establishments in various parts of the city. Eventually several thousand ratings were wearing Caroline cap tallies. The first such establishment was set up in the Belfast Custom House. Later, Belfast Castle was taken over and included a radio station. There were depth charge pistol and Hedgehog repair workshops associated with HMS Caroline, some of which would have been on the quays beside her berth in Milewater Basin.

During the early part of the Second World War when RAF Belfast occupied Sydenham (Belfast harbour) airfield, Fleet Air Arm personnel based there were lodged under HMS Caroline.

Postwar

After the Second World War, the Royal Navy returned Caroline to the Royal Naval Volunteer Reserve, and she served as its last afloat training establishment. She underwent a refit at Harland and Wolff in Belfast in 1951.

The Royal Naval Reserve Unit decommissioned from the ship in December 2009, moved ashore, and recommissioned as the "stone frigate" (i.e., shore establishment) . Caroline herself was decommissioned on 31 March 2011 in a traditional ceremony. Her ensign was laid up in St Anne's Cathedral in Belfast.

Preservation

Caroline is listed as part of the National Historic Fleet. On her decommissioning, she was placed into the care of the National Museum of the Royal Navy at Portsmouth, though remaining moored in her position in Alexandra Dock in Belfast. Although no longer capable of making way under her own power, Caroline remains afloat and in excellent condition. Buffeting from waves and high winds have caused the ship to almost come away from her moorings several times. In 2005, during a storm, she ripped several huge bollards out of the jetty concrete, but failed to break free entirely. She was not normally open to tourists, although entrance was gained during the annual  celebrations.

Upon Carolines decommissioning in 2011, her future was uncertain. Proposals were made to return the ship to her First World War appearance, which among other things would have involved sourcing and installing 6-inch (152.4 mm) and 4-inch (102 mm) guns of that era and removing the large deckhouse from her midships deck. One proposal considered was to remain in Belfast as a museum ship within the Titanic Quarter development alongside . Another proposal was a move to Portsmouth, with many of her original fittings restored to return her as much as possible to her First World War appearance. 

In June 2012 plans to move Caroline to Portsmouth were announced, subject to the availability of funding. However, in October 2012 the Northern Ireland government announced that the ship would remain in Belfast and that the National Heritage Memorial Fund had pledged £1,000,000 to help to restore her. In May 2013 the Heritage Lottery Fund announced an £845,600 grant to support conversion work as a museum.

In October 2014, the Heritage Lottery Fund announced a £12 million lottery funding boost to enable the National Museum of the Royal Navy to turn Caroline into a visitor attraction in time for centenary commemorations of the 1916 Battle of Jutland. Caroline remains moored in the Alexandra Dock in the Titanic Quarter in Belfast. During the restoration the steam turbines which were left in place after her active service life ended were conserved. The Parson turbines were stripped of asbestos and preserved for those visiting to see. 

In June 2016, HMS Caroline was opened to the public as a museum ship and forms part of the National Museum of the Royal Navy.

HMS Caroline was dry docked in late 2016 she was towed a short distance into Dry Dock to have hull inspection, clean and repaint. She returned to the Alexandra Dock on completion of the works and was placed into the dock stern first. In April 2019, she was one of five finalists on the shortlist for the Art Fund Museum of the Year award. She was also shortlisted on two categories for the RICS awards 2019.

Along with other tourist attractions, HMS Caroline closed her doors to the public on 17 March 2020, owing to the COVID-19 pandemic. The funding package from the Department for the Economy for HMS Caroline, to cover any shortfall in meeting costs, was in place until June 2020. The resultant funding gap threatened the continuation of HMS Caroline as a going concern in Belfast.  Talks over a new funding agreement between the DfE and the NMRN were ongoing. A new funding package was announced, that would allow HMS Caroline to reopen, in order to keep her in Belfast until at least 2038.   The reopening of Caroline to the general public from 1 April 2023 was announced by the NMRN.

Records
At her decommissioning in 2011, Caroline held the title of the second-oldest ship in Royal Navy service (behind HMS Victory), as well as being the last First World War British light cruiser in service. She is the last survivor of the Battle of Jutland.

Notes

References

Sources

Further reading

External links

 National Museum of the Royal Navy - HMS Caroline
 Daily Telegraph photo-gallery
 Battle of Jutland Crew Lists Project - HMS Caroline Crew List
 Sailors, with biographies, plotted on the Jutland Interactive Map of the NMRN
 Ships of the Caroline class

 

C-class cruisers
Ships built on the River Mersey
1914 ships
World War I cruisers of the United Kingdom
Ships and vessels of the National Historic Fleet
Northern Ireland in World War II
Museum ships in the United Kingdom